The National Music Council of the United States is an organization listed under Title 36 of the United States Code, founded in 1940 and chartered by the 84th Congress in 1956. The Council is composed of organizations of national scope interested in the development of music in the country. It represents the country to the International Music Council of UNESCO.

History
The National Music Council was co-founded in 1940 by Julia Ober, Harold Spivacke, Franklin Dunham, and Edwin Hughes.

Members

Academy of Country Music
American Academy of Teachers of Singing 
American Composers Forum
American Federation of Musicians
American Guild of Musical Artists
American Guild of Organists
American Harp Society
American Music Center
American Orff-Schulwerk Association
American Society of Composers, Authors and Publishers
Broadcast Music, Inc. 
Chamber Music America
Chopin Foundation of the United States
Conductors Guild
Country Music Association
Delta Omicron international music fraternity
Early Music America
Interlochen Center for the Arts
International Alliance for Women in Music
International Association of Jazz Educators
International Federation of Festival Organizations (FIDOF)
International Music Products Association

League of American Orchestras
Mu Phi Epsilon, international professional music fraternity 
Music & Entertainment Industry Educators Association
Music Critics Association of North America
National Association for Music Education
Music Performance Fund
Music Publishers Association of the United States
Music Teachers National Association
National Academy of Popular Music
The Recording Academy
National Association of Negro Musicians
National Association of Teachers of Singing 
National Federation of Music Clubs
National Flute Association
National Guild of Community Schools of the Arts
National Guild of Piano Teachers/American College of Musicians
National Music Publishers Association
National Opera Association
Recording Industry Association of America
SESAC 
Sigma Alpha Iota international music fraternity (SAI)
Songwriters Guild of America

American Eagle Awards
Each year the Council presents the American Eagle Awards for distinguished service to American music. The recipients include:

1982:  Yehudi Menuhin and Jule Styne
1983: 	Van Cliburn and Benny Goodman
1984: 	Virgil Thomson and Lionel Hampton
1985: 	George Wein (Kool Jazz Festival) and Otto Luening
1986: 	Morton Gould and Dizzy Gillespie
1987: 	Odetta and Carnegie Hall (Isaac Stern)
1988: 	Betty Allen and Dave Brubeck
1989: 	William Schuman and Blue Note Records (Bruce Lundvall, President)
1990: 	Rise Stevens and Billy Taylor
1991: 	Marian Anderson and Peter Schickele
1992: 	Elliott Carter and Max Roach
1993: 	Lena Horne and Roberta Peters
1994: 	Richard Riley and Jim Chapin
1995: 	Dorothy DeLay and Lee Eliot Berk
1996: 	Betty Carter, Bob McGrath and Shari Lewis
1997: 	Phil Ramone, The Oak Ridge Boys
1998: 	The Marsalis Family, John Sykes, Texaco, Inc. (Corporate Award)
1999: 	Roy Clark and Clark Terry, American Express (Corporate Award)
2000: 	Schuyler Chapin, Roberta Guaspari, And Leonard Slatkin
2001: 	John Corigliano, Michael Kamen, and Marian McPartland
2002: 	Margaret Whiting, Dawn Upshaw; United Service Organizations (USO)
2003: 	Richie Havens, William Warfield, The Waverly Consort
2004:  Hal David, MetLife Foundation
2005: 	Stephen Sondheim, Sesame Workshop, Congressman John Conyers, Jr., Senator Orrin Hatch
2006: 	Richard Adler, Barbara Cook, Ervin M. Drake, Henry Juszkiewicz
2007: 	Clive Davis, Sheldon Harnick, VH1 Save the Music Foundation
2008: 	Lorin Maazel and Tom Chapin
2009:  Herbie Hancock, Quincy Jones and the Hard Rock Cafe
2010:  Kenny Rogers, Suzanne Vega, Ann Johns Ruckert, John Mahlmann and  The Musical Instrument Museum, Phoenix
2011:  Paquito D'Rivera, Nile Rodgers, Peter Yarrow, Doris Duke Charitable Foundation
2012:  Theodore Bikel, Judy Collins, Paul Shaffer, Sonny Fox (Golden Eagle Award), Cracker Barrel Country Store
2015:  Kris Kristofferson, Charley Pride, Jim Lauderdale, Jim Halsey, Sherman Halsey, Music Makes Us
2016: Emmylou Harris, Vince Gill, Grand Ole Opry

References

External links

Non-profit organizations based in the United States
Arts organizations established in 1940
Music organizations based in the United States
Patriotic and national organizations chartered by the United States Congress
International Music Council